Tebu is a small family of two Saharan languages, consisting of Daza and Teda. It is spoken by the two groups of Toubou people, the Daza and Teda.

Tebu is predominantly spoken in Chad and in southern Libya by around 580,000 people. Daza and Teda have an estimated 537,000 and 42,500 speakers, respectively.

References

 

 
Saharan languages
Languages of Chad
Languages of Libya
Languages of Niger
Toubou people